The 11th Meril Prothom Alo Awards were distributed among TV and film starts and singers 10 April 2009 to honour and inspire the young talents for playing their role in the fields of music, film-making and TV production. The Bangladesh-China Friendship Conference Centre turned into a union of cultural personalities on that evening as the Prothom Alo and Square Toiletries staged the programme to honour the stars. The nominations for the popular awards were open to public voting.

Awards and nominations

Lifetime Achievement Award – 2009
 Noted cameraman and film director Baby Islam

Public Choice Awards – 2008

Critics' Choice Awards – 2008

Special Critics' Awards – 2008

Host and Jury Board
Noted silver screen artiste Ferdous Ahmed and TV actress Aupee Karim conducted the colourful program with their lively and witty anchoring. Award-winning comedian Naveed came up on the dais to present his stand-up comedy to the fun-loving audience who gave him a big round of applause. The member of Jury Board for Dance section were Kamrunnesa Hasan, Lubna Mariam, and Arun Basu; Jury Board for music section were Alam Khan, Sheikh Sadi Khan, Sujay Sham, Shadi Muhammad, and Kanak Chapa; Jury Board for Television section Ramendu Majumdar, Syed Monzurul Islam, Tariq Anam Khan, Shamim Akhter, Zahedur Rahim Anjan, and Sazzad Sharif; and Jury Board for Film section were Hasnat Abdul Hai, Shibli Sadiq, Tareque Masud, Ilias Kanchan, Sabbir Ahmed Chowdhury, A.K.M. Jakariya.

Presenters and performers

Presenters

Performers

See also
 National Film Awards
 Bachsas Awards
 Babisas Award

References

External links

Meril-Prothom Alo Awards ceremonies
2008 film awards
2009 awards in Bangladesh
2009 in Dhaka
April 2009 events in Bangladesh